Damir Ibrić Yüksel (born 30 March 1984) is a Bosnian-Herzegovinian retired footballer who last played as a striker for Faroese club B68 Toftir.

He was born in Izmit, Turkey and has dual citizenship, Bosnian and Turkish. His father, Senad Ibrić, was also a footballer and played for Kocaelispor.

Club career
In 1997, when he was only 13 years old, he moved to Le Havre AC from Turkish side Kocaelispor. He was attending one of the most prestigious youth football academy in the world at that time. After 5 successful years in Le Havre AC he moved to Turkish club Gençlerbirliği. During time in Gençlerbirliği, he was part of the squad who reached UEFA Cup quarterfinal and played in Turkish Cup final.

He played with Kocaelispor in the Turkish Second League between 2010 and 2012, then in 2012–13 he played with CS Concordia Chiajna in the Romanian Liga I, and in 2013 he joined T–Team F.C. and played in the Malaysia Super League.

References

http://www.zaman.com.tr/haber.do?haberno=587549
http://webarsiv.hurriyet.com.tr/2005/07/17/673465.asp

External links
 

1984 births
Living people
Sportspeople from İzmit
Association football forwards
Bosnia and Herzegovina footballers
Bosnia and Herzegovina under-21 international footballers
Gençlerbirliği S.K. footballers
Yıldırım Bosna S.K. footballers
Kocaelispor footballers
Qingdao Hainiu F.C. (1990) players
Eyüpspor footballers
CS Concordia Chiajna players
Terengganu F.C. II players
FK Mladost Velika Obarska players
Sheikh Russel KC players
FK Lovćen players
B68 Toftir players
Süper Lig players
TFF First League players
TFF Third League players
Chinese Super League players
Liga I players
Malaysia Super League players
Premier League of Bosnia and Herzegovina players
Bangladesh Premier League players
Montenegrin First League players
Faroe Islands Premier League players
Bosnia and Herzegovina expatriate footballers
Expatriate footballers in France
Bosnia and Herzegovina expatriate sportspeople in France
Expatriate footballers in China
Bosnia and Herzegovina expatriate sportspeople in China
Expatriate footballers in Romania
Bosnia and Herzegovina expatriate sportspeople in Romania
Expatriate footballers in Malaysia
Bosnia and Herzegovina expatriate sportspeople in Malaysia
Expatriate footballers in Bangladesh
Expatriate footballers in Montenegro
Bosnia and Herzegovina expatriate sportspeople in Montenegro
Expatriate footballers in the Faroe Islands
Bosnia and Herzegovina expatriate sportspeople in the Faroe Islands